The Reggio Calabria International  or Internazionale di Reggio Calabria was a men's and women's international clay court tennis tournament founded in 1959. It was played at the ASD "Rocco Polimeni" Tennis Club,  Reggio Calabria, Calabria, Italy. The tournament ran until 1970.

History
In April 1959 ASD "Rocco Polimeni" Tennis Club in Regio Calabria established an open international tennis tournament for men and women. The tournament was played on outdoor clay courts at Reggio Calabria, Calabria, Italy through till 1970. It would be another twenty one years until 1991 before another international tournament was staged at the same venue, the Reggio Calabria Challenger tournament that ran till 1992.

Finals

Men's singles

Women's singles

References

Clay court tennis tournaments
Defunct tennis tournaments in Italy